Georg Friedrich Knapp (7 March 1842 – 20 February 1926) was a German economist who in 1905 published The State Theory of Money, which founded the chartalist school of monetary theory, which argues that money's value derives from its issuance by an institutional form of government rather than spontaneously through relations of exchange.

Biography
Knapp was born on 7 March 1842. His father was the acclaimed chemist Friedrich Ludwig Knapp. Knapp studied in Munich, Berlin and Göttingen, and in 1867 became director of the Statistical Bureau of Leipzig. In 1869 he was appointed assistant professor of economics and statistics in the University of Leipzig. In 1874 he was appointed a professor of political economy at the University of Strasbourg, where he remained until 1918. He was also rector at Strasbourg in 1891–1892 and 1907–1908.

In 1886, he founded the periodical Abhandlungen aus dem staatswissenschaftlichen Seminar zu Strassburg.

Family
Knapp was the father of Elly Heuss-Knapp, the future wife of Theodor Heuss, the first President of the Federal Republic of Germany.

He raised his two daughters alone, uncommon at the time, after their Georgian-born mother, Knapp's wife Lydia v. Karganow, became mentally ill.

The State Theory of Money

Knapp is mostly remembered for this book which was partially translated into English by the Royal Economic Society and published for the first time in the United Kingdom in 1924, nineteen years after its first publication in German.

The State Theory of Money sets about to build a theory which could encompass indifferent monetary systems based on precious metals or paper money. Knapp's approach is naturalistic. As a theorist, he does not want to recommend what the monetary ought to be, nor does he explore how money could be put to use in order to attain certain goals. Drawing almost entirely on examples set in 19th century Europe, he derives from them a genetic and then a functional classification. In the process, the book reveals that some of what had been previously thought to be 'specie' money, was simply what he calls 'chartal hylogenic money'. An avowed Chartalist, Knapp does not advocate paper money pure and simple, he points out effectively that the Metallists with their theory cannot effectively explain some observed phenomena which they call 'anomalies'. To the contrary, Knapp thinks his theory is able to explain the manifold monetary systems mentioned in the book. Apart from its theoretical insights, the book is particularly interesting in that it is a very detailed source of information on 19th century European monetary history, focusing on the following countries: England, France, Holland, Austria and Germany. Due to a lack of financial means, the Royal Economic Society voluntary omitted the translation of Chapter IV which contains a historical review of England, France, Germany, Austria, and appendices containing specific case studies. All the same, even in its abridged English version The State Theory of Money depicts precisely the many changes which happened during the course of the 19th century: a general move from bimetallism to monometallism, the appearance and disappearance of paper money systems (in particular the Austrian one of 1866), the almost systematic use of paper money by the State in case of war alongside existing means of payment, the emergence of bank-notes and the use of Giro payments etc.

Publications
His earlier writings deal chiefly with population and agricultural topics.
 
 ("On the ascertainment of mortality").
 ("Mortality in Saxony").

 ("The theory of population fluctuations").
 ("The liberation of peasants and the origins of the agriculturalist in the older parts of Prussia").
 ("The liberation of peasants and the origins of the agriculturalist in the older parts of Prussia").
 ("The farmer in serfdom and freedom").

 Translation of the fourth edition.
 ("Land ownership and seignorial lands").

Honours 

 Pour le Mérite for Sciences and Arts (24 January 1918).

See also
 Fiat money vs. commodity money
 Modern Monetary Theory
 Keynesianism

References

External links

 Archive for the History of Economic Thought
 The State Theory of Money (English translation). 1924.
 

1842 births
1926 deaths
University of Göttingen alumni
Academic staff of the University of Strasbourg
Historical school economists
Recipients of the Pour le Mérite (civil class)
20th-century  German  economists
19th-century  German  economists